What Scoundrels Men Are! is a 1932 Italian "white-telephones" comedy film directed by Mario Camerini.

The film was a great success, De Sica and Lia Franca became stars and the song Parlami d'amore Mariù was a hit. Rare in Italian film history, it was filmed on real Milan locations, nowadays it is a sort of documentary on what Milan was like in the 1930s. It was produced by Cines with film sets designed by the art director Gastone Medin. The film was remade in 1953 by Glauco Pellegrini.

Cast
 Lia Franca as Mariuccia  
 Vittorio De Sica as Bruno  
 Cesare Zoppetti as Tadino  
 Aldo Moschino  as Count Piazzi 
 Carola Lotti as Gina  
 Anna D'Adria as Letizia  
 Gemma Schirato  as Widow  
 Maria Montesano as Candies woman  
 Tino Erler as Mario Castelli  
 María Denis
 Didaco Chellini as The engineer

External links
 

1930s Italian-language films
1932 films
1932 comedy films
Italian black-and-white films
Films set in Italy
Films set in Milan
Films directed by Mario Camerini
Italian comedy films
1930s Italian films